Drefach is a small village in the  community of Llanwenog, Ceredigion, Wales. Dre-fach is represented in the Senedd by Elin Jones (Plaid Cymru) and is part of the Ceredigion constituency in the House of Commons.

References

Villages in Ceredigion